Castriyón is one of seven parishes (administrative divisions) in Boal, a municipality within the province and autonomous community of Asturias, in northern Spain.

Villages

References

Parishes in Boal